Dennis Joseph Gallagher (1939 – April 22, 2022) was an American politician.

Gallagher was born in Denver, Colorado. He graduated from Regis University in 1961 with a bachelor's degree and from Catholic University of America in 1967, with a master's degree. Gallagher also went to the Harvard Kennedy School. He served on the Denver City Council, from 1995 to 2014, in the Colorado House of Representatives, from 1970 to 1974 and the Colorado Senate from 1974 to 1994. He also served as the Denver City Auditor from 2003 to 2014 and was a Democrat.

References

1939 births
2022 deaths
Politicians from Denver
Harvard Kennedy School alumni
Regis University alumni
Catholic University of America alumni
Denver City Council members
Democratic Party Colorado state senators
Democratic Party members of the Colorado House of Representatives